Cephonodes hylas, the coffee bee hawkmoth, pellucid hawk moth or coffee clearwing, is a moth of the family Sphingidae. The species was first described by Carl Linnaeus in 1771. A widely distributed moth, it is found in the Near East, Middle East, Africa, India, Sri Lanka, Japan, Southeast Asia and Australia.

Description
It has transparent wings and a stout body like a bumble bee. Its wingspan of 45–73 mm. Its marginal borders are very narrow and black. Abdomen varies in colour from yellow to green. Nominate subspecies has bright reddish 3rd and 4th abdominal segments. Larva have two colour forms, green and blackish. In greenish form, body greenish with a white-bordered blue dorsal line and whitish sub-dorsal line ending in a yellow streak at base of horn. Head and spiracles are blue. In the dark-coloured form, head brown or pale orange and rest of body smoky black. Pupa dark brown.

Ecology
Larvae are sluggish but eat very greedily and continuously. Its larvae feed on Burchellia, Gardenia, Kraussia, Pavetta and Vangueria species. Parasitoids such as Ooencyrtus papilionis and Blepharipa zebrine are found on larva.

Subspecies
Cephonodes hylas hylas - (Linnaeus 1771) (Sri Lanka to China and Japan)
Cephonodes hylas australis - Kitching & Cadiou, 2000 (Australia)
Cephonodes hylas melanogaster - Cadiou, 1998 (Indonesia)
Cephonodes hylas virescens - (Wallengren, 1865) (Ethiopian Region including Madagascar and the Seychelles)

References

Cephonodes
Moths described in 1771
Moths of Africa
Moths of Japan
Moths of Madagascar
Moths of the Middle East
Taxa named by Carl Linnaeus